The Texas brown tarantula, also known as Oklahoma brown tarantula or Missouri tarantula (Aphonopelma hentzi), is one of the most common species of tarantula living in the Southern United States today. Their bodies are dark brown, though shades may vary between individual tarantulas. The colors are more distinct after a molt, as with many arthropods.

Lifecycle
A female of  A. hentzi can lay up to 1,000 eggs. The eggs are positioned securely in a web shaped like a hammock, which remains in her burrow, and guarded by her. Eggs hatch in 45 to 60 days. Once spiderlings leave the egg sac, they often stay with the female for several days before dispersing to make their own burrows.

Females have been known to live up to 40 years. However, no studies have lasted this long, so their lifespan may be longer. Males rarely live over a year after they have matured.

Defense
A. hentzi is a rather docile and nonaggressive species. When disturbed, like most other tarantulas, A. hentzi maneuvers itself to a stance on its hind legs and raises its front legs in a threatening manner. Additionally, A. hentzi and most other tarantulas found in the Americas have small, coarse, brown or black urticating hairs on their abdomens that they kick in the direction of whatever they may feel threatens them. It is the main species preyed upon by the tarantula hawk, Pepsis grossa, in areas where the two species overlap.

Bites from the Texas brown tarantula, as with all New World tarantulas, are generally not a serious harm to humans except in the case of an allergic reaction. Due to the large size of their fangs, the puncture wound from a bite can also be painful and lead to secondary infection if not properly treated.

Distribution
The distribution of A. hentzi includes  Colorado, Kansas, Missouri, New Mexico, Oklahoma, Arkansas, Texas, and Louisiana in the U.S. The species has also been documented in the northern parts of Mexico, extending along the New Mexico and Texas borders.

Habitat
A. hentzi is a terrestrial species commonly found in grasslands, burrowed underground, or using logs, stones, or other small animals' abandoned dens as their homes and feeding grounds. Texas brown tarantulas  use their spinnerets to line the entrance of their shelters with webbing to detect passing prey.

References

External links

 canadianarachnology.org: Aphonopelma hentzi - Texas Brown Tarantula
 https://usaspiders.com/aphonopelma-hentzi-texas-brown-tarantula/

Aphonopelma
Spiders of Mexico
Spiders of the United States
Natural history of Missouri
Natural history of Oklahoma
Natural history of Texas
Natural history of Kansas
Natural history of Colorado
Natural history of Arkansas
Natural history of Louisiana